HMS Saucy was a British tug hired in the Second World War for use as a rescue tug in the Firth of Forth. She was lost with almost all crew on 4 September 1940 after hitting a mine.

Service

She measured 579 gross register tons and had a displacement of 700 tons, typically for a tug, a large part of the weight was the huge engine, designed to pull larger vessels in salvage operations.

In 1924 she was sold into commercial service but retained the name Saucy. In 1939 she was hired and commissioned by the Royal Navy with a crew of 31. In expectation of war, sea-mines had been laid in many strategic locations to prevent attacks by enemy vessels. The Firth of Forth was one of the many river estuaries so equipped. Mines were generally connected together with horizontal cables, with occasional anchor points to the sea-bed. However, rough seas would regularly detach a mine from its group and these then became a major hazard to shipping. Ironically therefore, minesweepers spent most of their time locating and disarming mines from their own country. Whilst many accounts (particularly contemporary) like to blame the enemy, accidents such as these (which were fairly common) were "self-inflicted wounds" when viewing on a national level.

There is a natural inclination to blame this sort of accident on an "enemy mine", however this sort of sea-mine was a defensive weapon, not a weapon of attack. The main minefield protecting the Forth lay east of Inchkeith, and it would be virtually impossible for a German mine to float through this defensive line. It is therefore a certainty that the mine was a rogue British mine escaped from the main field in one of the preceding winter storms. This was a regular occurrence and was dealt with my local minesweepers such as  who met her fate trying to defuse a British mine.

Unlike the Firefly (which was actively involved in trying to defuse a mine) all the evidence is that there was no forewarning of a mine near HMS Saucy, and the ship exploded violently without warning and sank within minutes at the spot where she was steaming. Typically, due to wartime censorship, this sort of accident received no press coverage.

18 of the 26 crew lost were from Brixham in Devon. Only seven bodies were recovered, five being from Brixham. These seven were buried in Seafield Cemetery in north Edinburgh, a few miles south of the disaster site.

Wreckage

The wreck lies 15m deep 2.5km off Inchkeith island at  bearing of 277 degrees from the island, and was permanently marked by an orange buoy. In October 1945 the wreck was reduced by controlled explosion to reduce the hazard to shipping and the buoy was removed. By 1967 a survey revealed that the wreck was no longer perceptible, being lost in the silt.

Memorial

A bronze memorial plaque on the Old Fishmarket Building at Brixham Harbour, unveiled on 4 September 2004, lists the 18 Brixham men lost and then the 8 non-Brixham men. It states that seven of the Brixham men were related to each other. Records show three members of the Harvey family from Brixham, dying, were related to each other. A non-Brixham father and son (the Reids) were related. Two further Brixham relations are presumed to have survived but the survivors were not named.

The 19 men whose bodies went down with the ship, or were otherwise unrecovered, are listed on panel 21 of the Liverpool Naval Memorial.

References
 

Merchant ships of the United Kingdom
Ships built on the Humber
1918 ships
Tugboats